The 2015 Boise State Broncos football team represented Boise State University during the 2015 NCAA Division I FBS football season. The Broncos were led by second-year head coach Bryan Harsin and played their home games at Albertsons Stadium. They were members of the Mountain West Conference in the Mountain Division. They finished the season 9–4, 5–3 in Mountain West play to finish in a four-way tie for second place in the Mountain Division. They were invited to the Poinsettia Bowl where they defeated Northern Illinois.

Preseason

Award watch lists
Listed in the order that they were released.

Paul Hornung Award – Sr. WR Shane Williams-Rhodes

Chuck Bednarik Award – Jr. DE Kamalei Correa & Sr. S Darian Thompson

Rimington Trophy – Sr. C Marcus Henry

Outland Trophy – Sr. C Marcus Henry

Bronko Nagurski Trophy – Jr. DE Kamalei Correa & Sr. S Darian Thompson

Jim Thorpe Award – Sr. CB Donte Deayon & Sr. S Darian Thompson

Lombardi Award – Jr. DE Kamalei Correa, Sr. C Marcus Henry, Sr. OL Rees Odhiambo & Jr. LB Tanner Vallejo

Fred Biletnikoff Award – Jr. WR Thomas Sperbeck

Wuerffel Trophy – Sr. WR Shane Williams-Rhodes

Walter Camp Award – Sr. S Darian Thompson

Mountain West media days
At the Mountain West media days, held at the Cosmopolitan in Las Vegas, Nevada, the Broncos were picked as the overwhelming favorites to win the Mountain Division title, receiving 28 of a possible 30 first place votes. Sr. C Marcus Henry and Sr. OL Rees Odhiambo were selected to the all-conference first team offense. Jr. DE Kamalei Correa, Jr. LB Tanner Vallejo, Sr. CB Donte Deayon and Sr. S Darian Thompson were selected to the all-conference first team defense.

Media poll

Mountain Division
 Boise State – 177 (28)
 Utah State – 150 (2)
 Colorado State – 108
 Air Force – 90
 Wyoming – 64
 New Mexico – 41

Schedule

Schedule Source:

Game summaries

Washington

 Passing leaders: Ryan Finley (BSU): 16–26, 129 YDS, 1 INT; Jake Browning (WASH): 20–34, 150 YDS, 1 INT.
 Rushing leaders: Jeremy McNichols (BSU): 24 CAR, 89 YDS, 2 TD; Dwayne Washington (WASH): 8 CAR, 14 YDS
 Receiving leaders: Thomas Sperbeck (BSU): 3 REC, 28 YDS; Dwayne Washington (WASH): 7 REC, 68 YDS.

at BYU

 Passing leaders: Ryan Finley (BSU): 25–38, 297 YDS, 1 TD, 3 INT; Tanner Mangum (BYU): 17–28, 309 YDS, 2 TD, 2 INT.
 Rushing leaders: Jeremy McNichols (BSU): 15 CAR, 46 YDS, 2 TD; Adam Hine (BYU): 19 CAR, 93 YDS, 1 TD.
 Receiving leaders: Shane William-Rhodes (BSU): 11 REC, 107 YDS; Mitchell Juergens (BYU): 4 REC, 172 YDS, 2 TD.

Idaho State

 Passing leaders: Brett Rypien (BSU): 8–9, 126 YDS; Michael Sanders (ISU): 21–42, 169 YDS, 1 INT.
 Rushing leaders: Jeremy McNichols (BSU): 15 CAR, 69 YDS, 3 TD; Xavier Finney (ISU): 14 CAR, 38 YDS.
 Receiving leaders: Thomas Sperbeck (BSU): 7 REC, 99 YDS; Madison Mangum (ISU): 7 REC, 98 YDS.

In the first quarter, starting quarterback Ryan Finley left the game after fracturing his right ankle. He was expected to miss eight weeks. However, he did not return in the 2015 season. The last two Boise State starting quarterbacks to miss time with injuries were also from broken right ankles (Ryan Dinwiddie in 2002 and Joe Southwick in 2013).

at Virginia

 Passing leaders: Brett Rypien (BSU): 24–35, 321 YDS, 3 TD; Matt Johns (UVA): 12–25, 199 YDS, 2 TD, 2 INT
 Rushing leaders: Jeremy McNichols (BSU): 9 CAR, 69 YDS, 1 TD; Daniel Hamm (UVA): 8 CAR, 22 YDS
 Receiving leaders: Thomas Sperbeck (BSU): 5 REC, 121 YDS, 2 TD; Taquan Mizzell (UVA): 5 REC, 59 YDS, 1 TD

Hawaii

 Passing leaders: Brett Rypien (BSU): 19–25, 271 YDS, 3 TD; Max Wittek (UH): 7–24, 66 YDS, 2 INT.
 Rushing leaders: Jeremy McNichols (BSU): 20 CAR, 108 YDS, 2 TD; Steven Lakalaka (UH): 8 CAR, 34 YDS.
 Receiving leaders: Chaz Anderson (BSU): 5 REC, 95 YDS, 1 TD; Marcus Kemp (UH): 5 REC, 39 YDS.

at Colorado State

 Passing leaders: Brett Rypien (BSU): 22–35, 339 YDS, 1 TD, 1 INT; Coleman Key (CSU): 5–19, 56 YDS, 1 TD, 2 INT.
 Rushing leaders: Jeremy McNichols (BSU): 17 CAR, 104 YDS, 2 TD; Jasen Oden, Jr. (CSU): 19 CAR, 52 YDS.
 Receiving leaders: Thomas Sperbeck (BSU): 5 REC, 178 YDS, 2 TD; Rashard Higgins (CSU): 3 REC, 42 YDS.

at Utah State

 Passing leaders: Brett Rypien (BSU): 25–50, 299 YDS, 3 INT; Kent Myers (USU): 17–24, 157 YDS, 3 TD.
 Rushing leaders: Kelsey Young (BSU): 20 CAR, 60 YDS, 2 TD; Devante Mays (USU): 11 CAR, 63 YDS, 1 TD.
 Receiving leaders: Thomas Sperbeck (BSU): 6 REC, 156 YDS; Hunter Sharp (USU): 7 REC, 42 YDS, 2 TD.

Wyoming

 Passing leaders: Brett Rypien (BSU): 22–28, 211 YDS, 3 TD; Cameron Coffman (WYO): 8–13, 70 YDS, 1 TD, 1 INT.
 Rushing leaders: Jeremy McNichols (BSU): 33 CAR, 166 YDS, 1 TD; Brian Hill (WYO): 23 CAR, 76 YDS.
 Receiving leaders: Thomas Sperbeck (BSU): 6 REC, 84 YDS, 2 TD; Jake Maulhardt (WYO): 6 REC, 76 YDS, 1 TD.

at UNLV

 Passing leaders: Brett Rypien (BSU): 35–52, 469 YDS, 2 TD; Blake Decker (UNLV): 29–50, 357 YDS, 2 INT.
 Rushing leaders: Jeremy McNichols (BSU): 22 CAR, 122 YDS, 1 TD; Xzaviar Campbell (UNLV): 9 CAR, 29 YDS, 1 TD.
 Receiving leaders: Thomas Sperbeck (BSU): 10 REC, 163 YDS; Devonte Boyd (UNLV): 10 REC, 116 YDS.

New Mexico

 Passing leaders: Brett Rypien (BSU): –, 2 TD, 3 INT; Austin Apodaca (UNM): 8–12, 172 YDS, 1 INT.
 Rushing leaders: Jeremy McNichols (BSU): 26 CAR, 128 YDS, 1 TD; Jhurell Pressley (UNM): 9 CAR, 132 YDS, 1 TD.
 Receiving leaders: Thomas Sperbeck (BSU): , ; Delane Hart-Johnson (UNM): 1 REC, 81 YDS.

Air Force

 Passing leaders: Brett Rypien (BSU): 23–48, 237 YDS, 1 TD; Karson Roberts (AF): 9–16, 279 YDS, 2 TD, 3 INT.
 Rushing leaders: Jeremy McNichols (BSU): 20 CAR, 151 YDS, 1 TD; Jacobi Owens (AF): 9 CAR, 132 YDS.
 Receiving leaders: Thomas Sperbeck (BSU): 7 REC, 79 YDS, 1 TD; Garrett Griffin (AF): 3 REC, 107 YDS, 1 TD.

at San Jose State

 Passing leaders: Brett Rypien (BSU): 25–33, 197 YDS, 2 TD; Kenny Potter (SJSU): 28–41, 336 YDS, 3 TD, 2 INT.
 Rushing leaders: Jeremy McNichols (BSU): 20 CAR, 192 YDS, 2 TD; Tyler Ervin (SJSU): 11 CAR, 52 YDS.
 Receiving leaders: Thomas Sperbeck (BSU): 6 REC, 45 YDS; Billy Freeman (SJSU): 7 REC, 109 YDS, 1 TD.

Northern Illinois–Poinsettia Bowl

 Passing leaders: Brett Rypien (BSU): 29–40, 377 YDS, 3 TD, 1 INT; Ryan Graham (NIU): 7–21, 38 YDS.
 Rushing leaders: Jeremy McNichols (BSU): 19 CAR, 93 YDS, 2 TD; Joel Bouagnon (NIU): 8 CAR, 16 YDS.
 Receiving leaders: Jeremy McNichols (BSU): 5 REC, 96 YDS, 1 TD; Kenny Golladay (NIU): 3 REC, 12 YDS.

Boise State out-gained Northern Illinois 654–33 in total yards. Boise State had 2 more first downs (35) than Northern Illinois had in total yards.

Rankings

Scores by quarter
All opponents

Mountain West opponents

Post-season awards

Mountain West Freshman of the Year
Brett Rypien – Fr. QB (first Boise State player to win MW freshman of the year award)

Mountain West first team
Offense

Brett Rypien – Fr. QB

Thomas Sperbeck – Jr. WR

Marcus Henry – Sr. OL

Rees Odhiambo – Sr. OL

Tyler Rausa – Jr. K

Defense

Darian Thompson – Sr. DB

Mountain West second team
Offense

Jeremy McNichols – So. RB

Jake Roh – So. TE

Defense

Kamalei Correa – Jr. DL

Donte Deayon – Sr. DB

Mountain West honorable mention
Tyler Horn – Sr. DL

Tanner Vallejo – Jr. LB

Mario Yakoo – Jr. OL

Award Reference:

Coaching staff

Roster

References

Boise State
Boise State Broncos football seasons
Poinsettia Bowl champion seasons
Boise State Broncos football